
Year 5 BC was a common year starting on Monday or Tuesday (link will display the full calendar) of the Julian calendar (the sources differ, see leap year error for further information) and a leap year starting on Saturday of the Proleptic Julian calendar. In the Roman world, it was known as the Year of the Consulship of Augustus and Sulla (or, less frequently, year 749 Ab urbe condita). The denomination 5 BC for this year has been used since the early medieval period, when the Anno Domini calendar era became the prevalent method in Europe for naming years.

Events 
 March – Probable nova in the constellation Aquila.
 c. December – Probable supernova in the constellation Capricornus.

Births 
 January 15 – Guang Wu, Chinese emperor of the Han Dynasty (d. AD 57)
 Aemilia Lepida, Roman noblewoman and fiancee of Claudius (d. AD 43)
 Lucius Vitellius the Elder, Roman consul and governor of Syria (d. AD 51)
 The birthdates of John the Baptist and Jesus are not generally known, but 5 BC is often assumed to be the date. The spring Passover feast (often around April 21) has been cited as a possible date for the birth of Christ, assuming that this had relevance to being a Messiah claimant, or that his birthday might have been related to Passover. Others theologically tie his birth to Sukkot, the fall Feast of Tabernacles.
 John the Baptist (d. c. AD 30)
 Possibly 29 September – Jesus

Deaths 
 Acme (enslaved woman), Jewish slave and personal maid in the service of the Empress Livia Drusilla, wife of Augustus
 Curia, Roman noblewoman and wife of Quintus Lucretius Vespillo

References